Robert E. Reed (born January 14, 1975) is a former American football wide receiver who played for the San Diego Chargers of the National Football League (NFL). He played college football at University of Arkansas, University of Mississippi and Lambuth University.

References 

1975 births
Living people
Players of American football from Mississippi
American football wide receivers
Ole Miss Rebels football players
Arkansas Razorbacks football players
Lambuth Eagles football players
San Diego Chargers players